Cutoff is an unincorporated community in Macon County, in the U.S. state of Georgia.

History
The community's name is derived from a local petition to transfer jurisdiction of the town site (i.e. "cut off") from Sumter County to Macon County for the convenience of the area residents.

References

Unincorporated communities in Macon County, Georgia